The 2000 Stanford Cardinal baseball team represented Stanford University in the 2000 NCAA Division I baseball season. The Cardinal played their home games at Sunken Diamond in Palo Alto, California. The team was coached by Mark Marquess in his twenty-fourth season as head coach at Stanford.

The Cardinal reached the College World Series, finishing as the runner up to LSU.

Roster

Schedule

References 

Stanford
Stanford Cardinal baseball seasons
College World Series seasons
Stanford Baseball
Stanford
Pac-12 Conference baseball champion seasons